Progress 12 was a Soviet unmanned Progress cargo spacecraft, which was launched in January 1981 to resupply the Salyut 6 space station.

Spacecraft
Progress 12 was a Progress 7K-TG spacecraft. The twelfth of forty three to be launched, it had the serial number 113. The Progress 7K-TG spacecraft was the first generation Progress, derived from the Soyuz 7K-T and intended for uncrewed logistics missions to space stations in support of the Salyut programme. On some missions the spacecraft were also used to adjust the orbit of the space station.

The spacecraft were powered by chemical batteries, and could operate in free flight for up to three days, remaining docked to the station for up to thirty.

Launch
Progress 12 launched on 24 January 1981 from the Baikonur Cosmodrome in the Kazakh SSR. It used a Soyuz-U rocket.

Docking
Progress 12 docked with the aft port of Salyut 6 on 26 January 1981 at 15:56 UTC, and was undocked on 19 March 1981 at 18:14 UTC.

Decay
It remained in orbit until 20 March 1981, when it was deorbited. The deorbit burn occurred at 16:59 UTC.

See also

 1981 in spaceflight
 List of Progress missions
 List of uncrewed spaceflights to Salyut space stations

References

Progress (spacecraft) missions
1980 in the Soviet Union
Spacecraft launched in 1981
Spacecraft which reentered in 1981
Spacecraft launched by Soyuz-U rockets